James Mackintosh Wiseman (13 February 1816 – 19 July 1839) was an English first-class cricketer and British Army officer.

The son of Sir William Saltonstall Wiseman, he was born at Hastings in February 1816. He later studied at University College at the University of Oxford. While studying at Oxford, he made a single appearances in first-class cricket for Oxford University against the Marylebone Cricket Club at Oxford in 1836. Batting twice in the match, he was dismissed for a single run in the Oxford first innings by John Bayley, while in their second innings he was run out without scoring.

After graduating from Oxford, Wiseman served in British India as an ensign with the Bombay Army. He was killed in the Sindh in July 1839.

References

External links

1816 births
1839 deaths
People from Hastings
Alumni of University College, Oxford
English cricketers
Oxford University cricketers
British Indian Army officers
Younger sons of baronets